Calathotarsus is a genus of spiders in the family Migidae. It was first described in 1903 by Eugène Simon. , it contains 4 species, occurring in Chile and Argentina.

Species

References

Migidae
Mygalomorphae genera
Spiders of South America